People named Ettrich include:

Matthias Ettrich, founder of KDE and LyX
Antonín Ettrich, cross country skier

See also 
 Ettrick